Joaquim Pereira da Silva (born 19 November 1974), known as Martelinho, is a Portuguese retired footballer who played as a right winger, and a current manager.

He played ten full Primeira Liga seasons during his 14-year senior career, all with Boavista, where he contributed to their one league title in 2000–01.

Club career
Martelinho was born in São Paio de Oleiros, Santa Maria da Feira. He represented F.C. Marco, Boavista FC, C.D. Aves, Portonovo SD (Spain, amateurs) and F.C. Penafiel, being instrumental in Boavista's only Primeira Liga conquest in the club's history in the 2000–01 season, where in addition to scoring four goals in 30 matches he provided several assists to Brazilian forward Elpídio Silva; on 13 January 2001, he scored the only goal of the derby win over FC Porto at the Estádio do Bessa, as his team leapfrogged their neighbours to pole position.

In the summer of 2009, Martelinho returned to his very first youth club C.D. Feirense, managing its junior sides. He had already returned to active the previous year but in futsal, playing with FC Cidade de Lourosa, and accumulated both activities in the following years. He also managed Lusitânia F.C. and F.C. Cesarense in the third division, having two spells with the former and winning the Aveiro Football Association's District League in 2013.

Personal life
Martelinho's son, Diogo, who inherited his moniker, played as a midfielder but no higher than district level.

References

External links

1974 births
Living people
Sportspeople from Santa Maria da Feira
Portuguese footballers
Association football wingers
Primeira Liga players
Liga Portugal 2 players
Segunda Divisão players
Boavista F.C. players
F.C. Marco players
C.D. Aves players
F.C. Penafiel players
Tercera División players
Portonovo SD players
Portuguese expatriate footballers
Expatriate footballers in Spain
Portuguese expatriate sportspeople in Spain
Portuguese football managers
Portuguese men's futsal players